Forever Valentine is an unreleased studio album by alternative country band Whiskeytown, recorded between their Strangers Almanac and Pneumonia albums.  The album, produced by Chris Stamey, is notable for featuring Ben Folds on piano and ex-Firehose member Ed Crawford on guitar.

The band quickly recorded the album without their record label knowing about it, since it fell outside of the terms of their contract at that time.  In an interview with the Ryan Adams-Whiskeytown fan website AnsweringBell.com, Whiskeytown drummer Skillet Gilmore confirmed this.

Music journalist David Menconi calls Forever Valentine "an interesting yet unfocused record consisting of eleven quite good but quite different songs", citing it as "one of the leading entries in Ryan's catalog of 'lost' albums"; while Steven Hyden of Grantland says that it "ranks with Adams’s best Whiskeytown work".

Track listing

Personnel and production credits
 Ryan Adams – guitar, vocals
 Caitlin Cary – violin, vocals
 Ed Crawford – guitar
 Mike Daly – various instruments
 Ben Folds – piano
 Skillet Gilmore – drums
 Chris Stamey – bass guitar, producer
 Thomas O'Keefe – Project manager
Recorded at Scores/Slackmates, Raleigh, NC, and Modern Recording Service, Chapel Hill, NC

References

External links
 https://web.archive.org/web/20120314223217/http://www.answeringbell.com/Answering%20Bell/Index/sessions.htm A thoroughly researched Ryan Adams/Whiskeytown Sessionography.

Whiskeytown albums
Unreleased albums